Pleural disease occurs in the  pleural space, which  is the thin fluid-filled area in between the two pulmonary pleurae in the human body. There are several disorders and complications that can occur within the pleural area, and the surrounding tissues in the lung.

Pleural content anomalies
 Pneumothorax: a collection of air within the pleural cavity, arising either from the outside or from the lung.  Pneumothoraces may be traumatic, iatrogenic, or spontaneous.  A tension pneumothorax is a particular type of pneumothorax where the air may enter (though a defect of the chest wall, lung, or airways) on inspiration, but cannot exit on expiration. Each breath increases the amount of trapped air in the chest cavity, leading to further lung compression. This is often an urgent situation and may progress to a medical emergency if there is compromise of the venous return to the heart causing hypotension and rarely shock.
 Pleural effusion: a fluid accumulation within the pleural space. Abnormal collections of pleural fluid may be due to excessive fluid volume (i.e. excess intravenous fluids, kidney failure), decreased fluid protein (e.g. cirrhosis, proteinuria), heart failure, bleeding (hemothorax), infections (parapneumonic effusions, pleural empyema), inflammation, malignancies, or perforation of thoracic organs (i.e. chylothorax, esophageal rupture).

Pleural tumors 

Pleural tumors may be benign (i.e. solitary fibrous tumor) or malignant in nature.  Pleural mesothelioma is a type of malignant cancer associated with asbestos exposure. Under most other circumstances, pleural cancers are secondary malignancies associated with lung cancer due to its nearby location or as metastasis such as with breast cancer.

 Mesothelial tumors: pleural malignant mesothelioma.
 Pleural sarcomas
 Pleural angiosarcoma
 Pleural desmoplastic small round cell tumor (pleural DSRCT)
 Pleural synovial sarcoma
 Pleural solitary fibrous tumor (pleural SFT, can be benign or less commonly malignant)
 Smooth muscle tumors of the pleura
 Pleural carcinomas
 Pleural mucoepidermoid carcinoma
 Pleural pseudomesotheliomatous adenocarcinoma

Other pleural diseases 
 Pulmonary embolism
Pleurisy
Pneumonia
Pleural infections
 Pleural endometriosis
 Pleuritis
 Pleural mesothelial hyperplasia
 Pleural calcified fibrous pseudotumor
 Pleural thickening, including pleural plaques

See also
 Pleural cavity

References

External links 

Diseases of pleura